Aourou is a small town and principal settlement of the commune of Djélébou in the Cercle of Kayes in the Kayes Region of southwestern Mali.

References

Populated places in Kayes Region